A gubernatorial election was held on 3 April 2010 to elect the next governor of , a prefecture of Japan located in the Chūbu region of Honshu island..

Candidates 

Masanori Tanimoto, 64, incumbent since 1994, endorsed by SDP, Komeito, LDP, DPJ.
Yutaka Kuwabara, 64, former DPJ lawmaker.
Yoshinobu Kimura, 58, endorsed by JCP.
Teruo Yonemura, 70.

Source:

Results

References 

2010 elections in Japan
Ishikawa gubernational elections